Marshallese Americans are Americans of Marshallese descent or Marshallese people naturalized in the United States. According to the 2010 census, 22,434 people of Marshallese origin lived in the United States at that time, though that number has likely grown significantly over the last decade. A recent estimate puts the number at approximately 30,000 in 2018. The United States has the highest concentration of Marshallese people outside the Marshall Islands. Most of these Marshallese people live in Hawaii and Arkansas, with significant populations in Washington, California, Oklahoma and Oregon.

History 

In 1986, the Marshall Islands and the United States established an agreement called the Compact of Free Association, according to which the archipelago attained its full sovereignty. The treaty allows United States to provide defense, "social services and other benefits to the Marshall Islands" in exchange for military bases on the islands.

Under this treaty, Marshall Islanders can also travel and work in United States without having visas, although they must be legal permanent residents and go through the same naturalization process equal to that of all other nationalities. Because they have the legal right to travel and work in the U.S., few Marshallese immigrants seek or attain citizenship.

Immigration from the Marshall Islands to the United States first began in the 1980s. Additionally, when numerous layoffs occurred in the Marshall Islands in 2000, there was a second wave of migration of Marshallese to the U.S.

Most of them emigrated to Hawaii and Arkansas when Tyson Foods, the largest poultry meat distributor in the world, employed numerous Marshallese people on the islands. Therefore many Marshallese employees were transferred and relocated to Springdale, Arkansas, to the corporate headquarters of Tyson Foods. John Moody, the first Marshallese settler in Arkansas, came there in the 1980s.

Many Marshallese emigrate to the United States to give their children an education, while other Marshalleses seek better working conditions or a better health system than the one found in their country.

Furthermore, since 1996 many Marshallese children have been adopted by American parents. Between 1996 and 1999, over 500 Marshallese children were adopted by American families. These adoptions are a result of social marginalization and economic poverty suffered by the population of the archipelago. 
 Adoptions were further driven by unethical trafficking schemes for which some perpetrators are facing prosecution.

Demography 

Most Marshallese Americans reside in Hawaii and Arkansas. In 2020 it is estimated that some 15,000 Marshallese call Arkansas home. Most reside in Washington County, mainly in Springdale, home of Tyson Foods where many of them work. There are 7,400 living in Hawaii.

Other significant Marshallese populations include Spokane (Washington) and Costa Mesa (California). According to Karen Morrison, director of Spokane’s Odyssey World International, a nonprofit that provides services for immigrants, Spokane County is home of a community of 2,400 or 3,000 people of Marshallese origin. In 2006 Spokane-area schools had a lot of Marshallese students, so that "Spokane Public Schools has 370 students whose primary language is Marshallese"; these students form the second group, more numerous than the Spanish-speaking students (360 people) and following the Russian-speaking students (530 people) in these schools (in reference to non-English languages).

The houses of the Marshallese of the USA house several generations of the same family and are sparsely furnished. In general terms, the population (which now has a western diet) has been adversely affected by diabetes, heart disease, tuberculosis, obesity, and COVID-19.

Many Marshallese are Baptist. The Marshallese Bible study group at Cross Church, a Baptist congregation in Springdale, has grown quickly in recent years, although the service is done mostly in English, since the church lacks ministers who speak fluent Marshallese.

Children born in the United States to Marshallese families have dual citizenship.

Notable people
 Anju Jason, taekwondo practitioner
 Todd Lyght, American football player
 Haley Nemra, middle-distance runner
 Kathy Jetn̄il-Kijiner, poet and climate change activist

See also
 Marshallese people in Springdale, Arkansas

References

External links 
 Marshall Islanders: Migration Patterns and Health-Care Challenges
 For Pacific Islanders, Hopes and Troubles in Arkansas

American people of Marshallese descent
Marshallese American
Oceanian American
Pacific Islands American